Antimachus II Nikephoros (the epithet means "the Victorious") was an Indo-Greek king. He ruled a vast territory from the Hindu-Kush to the Punjab around 170 BCE. He was almost certainly the eponymous son of Antimachus I, who is known from a unique preserved tax receipt. Bopearachchi dated Antimachus II to 160–155 BCE on numismatical grounds, but changed this to 174–165 BCE after the tax receipt was revealed to synchronise his reign with that of Antimachus I. R. C. Senior has not dated Antimachus II but thinks that his coins were possibly Indian issues of Antimachus I, despite their different epithets and coin types.

In both of Boperachchi's reconstructions, Antimachus II was succeeded by Menander I who inherited three of his four monograms. Antimachus II probably fought against the Bactrian king Eucratides I, who had dethroned his father in Bactria.

Coins of Antimachus II

Antimachus II did not strike a portrait on his coins, likely since this was not custom in India. Neither did the early kings strike tetradrachms. Antimachus II struck a large number of bilingual drachms on the same lighter Indian standard as Apollodotus I, though round in shape. On the obverse is Nike, and on the reverse a king on horseback.

He also issued bilingual bronzes with aegis / laurel wreath and palm. Both these and the goddess Nike seem to allude to his epithet "the Victorious".

See also
Greco-Buddhism
Indo-Scythians

Notes

Sources

"Sylloge Nummorum Graecorum 9", American Numismatic Society, New York, 1997.

Greco-Bactrian kings
2nd-century BC rulers in Asia
Euthydemid dynasty